Potternewton Park is a public park located in Chapeltown, approximately two miles north of Leeds city centre, West Yorkshire, England.

Covering 32 acres, the park's attractions include open parkland, flower beds, a bowling green, a children's playground and sports facilities, including a skate park and basketball court, as well as a giant chessboard.

The park also hosts the annual Leeds West Indian Carnival.

References 

Parks and commons in Leeds